Baisha is a town of Nanchuan District, Chongqing, China. , it has 7 villages under its administration.

References

Township-level divisions of Chongqing